Natchaug may refer to:

Natchaug River, in Connecticut
Natchaug State Forest, in Connecticut
Natchaug Trail, in Connecticut
Natchaug School, in Connecticut
, a gasoline tanker in service with the United States Navy and Greek Navy